A health club (also known as a fitness club, fitness center, health spa, weight room and commonly referred to as a gym) is a place that houses exercise equipment for the purpose of physical exercise.

In recent years, the number of fitness and health services have increased, expanding the interest among the population. Today, health clubs and fitness centers are a reference of health services, rising the adherence to physical activity.

Facilities and services

Main workout area
Most health clubs have a main workout area, which primarily consists of free weights including dumbbells and barbells and the stands and benches used with these items and exercise machines, which use gears, cables and other mechanisms to guide the user's exercise. This area often includes mirrors so that exercisers can monitor and maintain correct posture during their workout.

Cardio area/exercise theatre 

A cardio theater or cardio area includes many types of cardiovascular training-related equipment such as rowing machines, stationary exercise bikes, elliptical trainers and treadmills. These areas often include a number of audio-visual displays, often TVs (either integrated into the equipment or placed on walls around the area itself) in order to keep exercisers entertained during long cardio workout sessions. Some gyms provide newspapers and magazines for users of the cardio theatre to read while working out.

Group exercise classes 

Most 2010-era health clubs offer group exercise classes that are conducted by certified fitness instructors or trainers. Group exercise classes are often considered the most important service in the centers for members' engagement. Many types of group exercise classes exist, but generally these include classes based on aerobics, cycling (spinning), boxing or martial arts, high intensity training, step yoga, regular yoga and hot (Bikram) yoga, pilates, muscle training, stretching, and self-defense classes such as Krav Maga and Brazilian Jiu-Jitsu. Health clubs with swimming pools often offer aqua aerobics classes. The instructors often must gain certification in order to teach these classes and ensure participant safety.

Sports facilities 

Some health clubs offer sports facilities such as a swimming pools, squash courts, indoor running tracks, ice rinks, or boxing areas. In some cases, additional fees are charged for the use of these facilities.

Personal training 

Most health clubs employ personal trainers who are accessible to members for training/fitness/nutrition/health advice and consultation. Personal trainers can devise a customized fitness routine, sometimes including a nutrition plan, to help clients achieve their goals. They can also monitor and train with members. More often than not, access to personal trainers involves an additional hourly fee.

Other services 

Newer health clubs generally include health-shops selling equipment, snack/protein bars and smoothies, restaurants, child-care facilities, member lounges and cafes. Some clubs have a sauna, steam room, or swimming pool and even nutrition counseling. Health clubs generally charge a fee to allow visitors to use the equipment, courses, and other provided services. In the 2010s, some health clubs became eco-friendly (e.g., zero waste) and incorporated principles of "green living" in its fitness regimen.

Levels of services and offerings

Health clubs offer many services and as a result, the monthly membership prices can vary greatly.  A recent study of American clubs found that the monthly cost of membership ranged from US$15 per month at basic chain clubs that offer limited amenities to over US$200 per month at spa-oriented clubs that cater to families and to those seeking social activities in addition to a workout. In addition, some clubs - such as many local YMCAs and JCCs - offer per-use punch cards or one-time fees for those seeking to use the club on an as-needed basis. These one-time fees are commonly referred to as day passes.

Costs can vary through the purchase of a higher-level membership, such as a Founders or a Life membership.  Such memberships often have a high up-front cost but a lower monthly rate, making them potentially beneficial to those who use the club frequently and hold their memberships for years.

Types of services in health clubs 

Health clubs in North America offer a number of facilities and services with different price points for different levels of services. Some services have differently-priced levels or tiers, such as regular, pro, platinum and gold facilities or packages. Some of the health and fitness facilities use cardio equipment, fitness screening, resistance-building equipment, pro shops, artificial sun-beds, health spas and saunas. The membership plans vary from as low as $20 per month, for value-priced gyms to as high as $700 per month. These health clubs, especially in the United States, are equipped with a range of facilities and provide personal trainer support.

History 
An early public gymnasium started in Paris in 1847. The first health clubs for the general public were probably opened in Santa Monica, California in 1947 by Vic Tanny.

See also
 Athleisure
 Country club
 Gym
Leisure centre
 Medspa
 Physical fitness
 Spa

References

 Carroll, L. "Choosing a health club", MSNBC Health, December 19, 2003. Accessed February 23, 2008.

External links

 
Bundled products or services